Synnøve Eriksen (born 27 February 1963 in Herøy, Møre og Romsdal) is a Norwegian novelist. She now lives in Oslo and has written the Bergfoss series (20 books). Her books have been translated to English as The Bergfoss Saga.

References

1963 births
Living people
Norwegian women novelists
People from Møre og Romsdal
University of Oslo alumni
21st-century Norwegian women writers